Borås is a village in Arendal municipality in Agder county, Norway. The village is located along the Norwegian County Road 410 on the east side (mainland side) of the Eikelandsfjorden.

References

Villages in Agder
Arendal